Instruments used in Anatomy dissections are as follows:

Instrument list

Image gallery

References

Navigation Box

Anatomy
Medical equipment